Dayenu (Hebrew:) is a song that is part of the Jewish holiday of Passover.  The word "dayenu" means approximately "it would have been enough", "it would have been sufficient", or "it would have sufficed" (day in Hebrew is "enough", and -enu the first person plural suffix, "to us").  This traditional up-beat Passover song is over one thousand years old. The earliest full text of the song occurs in the first medieval haggadah, which is part of the ninth-century Seder Rav Amram. The song is about being grateful to God for all of the gifts given to the Jewish people, such as taking them out of slavery, giving them the Torah and Shabbat, and had God only given one of the gifts, it would have still been enough. This is to show much greater appreciation for all of them as a whole. The song appears in the haggadah after the telling of the story of the exodus and just before the explanation of Passover, matzah, and the maror.

Stanzas
Dayenu has 15 stanzas representing the 15 gifts God bestowed. The first five involve freeing the Jews from slavery, the next describe the miracles He did for them, and the last five for the closeness to God He gave them. Each of the stanzas is followed by the word "Dayenu" (it would have been enough) sung repeatedly.  The 15 stanzas are as follows:

Five stanzas of leaving slavery

Five stanzas of miracles

Five stanzas of being with God

Text

Associated customs
Jews in Afghanistan and Iran hit each other over the head with green onions during the refrain beginning with the ninth stanza (Even if you had supplied our needs in the desert for 40 years but not provided us with manna). This may be due to a passage in Numbers 11:5–6, where the Israelites see manna and recall Egypt. "We remember the fish that we used to eat in Egypt, the cucumbers, the melons, the leeks, the onions and the garlic. Now our gullets are shriveled. There is nothing at all. Nothing but this manna to look at." It is thought that by beating each other with the onions they taught themselves not to yearn for Egypt or to forget Egyptian slavery.

In popular culture
 Independent Israeli guitarist and singer Udi Davidi recorded a modern rendition of "Dayenu" on his 2006 album entitled "Back To You".
 Pianist Richard Dworsky does a rendition of the song "Dayenu" every year during Passover on the public radio program A Prairie Home Companion.
 In Israeli screenings of The Rocky Horror Picture Show, after the line "if only we hadn't made this journey... if only the car hadn't broken down... oh, if only we were amongst friends... Or sane persons," the audience sings the chorus of "Dayenu".
 In the episode "Free to Be You and Me" of Supernatural, Dean tells the angel Castiel "Dayenu" as if the situation they are in is destined to be.
Near the beginning of the 2013 videogame BioShock Infinite, a preacher recites a spoken sermon in a form identical to the song ("If he had done this, but not this, it would have been enough"), but in praise of the game's major antagonist rather than of God.
 In 2015, The Maccabeats, an a cappella group at Yeshiva University, released a Passover music video featuring a mashup of "Dayenu" which incorporated eight different musical motifs, including doo-wop, polka, heavy metal, funk, hip-hop, "island", dubstep, and barbershop quartet.
 "Dayenu" was used to explain the final game of the 2016 World Series that gave the Chicago Cubs a win after 108 years of drought.
 Kiko Arguello, the founder of the Neocatechumenal Way, composed a song called "Dayenu" replacing the original, Jewish text with Christian text.

See also
Music of Israel
Jewish prayer

References

External links
 Listen to Dayenu online

Hebrew-language songs
Passover songs
List songs
Hebrew words and phrases in Jewish prayers and blessings